The 1970 Soviet football championship was the 38th seasons of competitive football in the Soviet Union and the 32nd among teams of sports societies and factories. CSKA won the championship becoming the Soviet domestic champions for the sixth time.

Honours

Notes = Number in parentheses is the times that club has won that honour. * indicates new record for competition

Soviet Union football championship

Class A Top Group

Golden match
 CSKA Moscow v Dinamo Moscow 0–0

Replay
 CSKA Moscow v Dinamo Moscow 4–3

Class A First Group

Class A Second Group

Subgroup 1

Subgroup 2

Subgroup 3

Class B

Russian Federation finals

Ukraine (second stage)

Ranking 1-14th

Ranking 15-27th

Kazakhstan

Central Asia

Top goalscorers

Class A Top Group
Givi Nodia (Dinamo Tbilisi) – 17 goals

Class A First Group
Yanosh Gobovda (Karpaty Lvov) – 24 goals

References

External links
 1970 Soviet football championship. RSSSF